Chaleh Murt (also Romanized as Chāleh Mūrt) is a village in Tarand Rural District, Jalilabad District, Pishva County, Tehran Province, Iran. At the 2006 census, its population was 29, in 7 families.

References 

Populated places in Pishva County